The 1922 Wake Forest Baptists football team was an American football team that represented Wake Forest University during the 1922 college football season. In its first and only season under head coach George Levene, the team compiled a 3–5–2 record.

Schedule

References

Wake Forest
Wake Forest Demon Deacons football seasons
Wake Forest Baptists football